Sediminibacter is a Gram-negative, chemoheterotrophic and non-motile genus of bacteria from the family of Flavobacteriaceae with on known species (Sediminibacter furfurosus).

References

Flavobacteria
Bacteria genera
Taxa described in 2007
Monotypic bacteria genera